Ernest Frederick Armstrong (July 14, 1878 – March 14, 1948) was a Canadian politician, soldier and dental surgeon. He was elected to the House of Commons of Canada in the 1925 election as a Member of the Conservative Party of Canada representing the riding of Timiskaming South. He was defeated in the 1926 election.

Born in Flesherton, Ontario, Canada, Armstrong served during World War I as a commanding officer for 159th Battalion, Canadian Expeditionary Force and the 197th Regiment and also served with the 4th Division in France and Belgium.

External links 
 

1878 births
1948 deaths
Conservative Party of Canada (1867–1942) MPs
Members of the House of Commons of Canada from Ontario